The Halmahera Sea languages, also known as the Raja Ampat-South Halmahera languages, are a branch of Malayo-Polynesian languages of eastern Indonesia. They are spoken on islands in the Halmahera Sea, and on its margins from the south-eastern coast of Halmahera to the Raja Ampat Islands off the western tip of New Guinea.

The languages of the Raja Ampat Islands show a strong Papuan substratum influence; it is not clear that they are actually Austronesian as opposed to relexified Papuan languages.

Remijsen (2001) and Blust (1978) linked the languages of Raja Ampat to the South Halmahera languages.  David Kamholz (2014) breaks up Raja Ampat, so that the structure of the Halmahera Sea languages is as follows:

South Halmahera
Ambel–Biga: Waigeo (Ambel), Biga
As
Maden
Maya–Matbat: Matbat, Ma'ya (Salawati, Laganyan (Legenyem), Wauyai, Kawe, Batanta; perhaps distinct languages)

References

South Halmahera–West New Guinea languages
Languages of western New Guinea
Halmahera